"Man Overboard" is a song by Australian rock/pop group Do-Ré-Mi recorded in 1982 for the EP The Waiting Room. The song was re-recorded in 1985 and released in May 1985 as the lead single from the group's debut studio album, 
Domestic Harmony. The 7" vinyl version has three tracks, which were written by lead vocalist Deborah Conway, drummer Dorland Bray, bass guitarist Helen Carter and guitarist Stephen Philip.

The song is the first Australian hit to include lyrics referring to anal humour, penis envy and pubic hair; it also had no chorus. The single version was produced and engineered by Gavin McKillop.

At the 1985 Countdown Music Awards, the song won Best Debut Single.

In 2001, Carter recalled the problems Do-Ré-Mi had with their record company over "Man Overboard" for the Australian Broadcasting Corporation TV series Long Way to the Top, "There was a real hit-maker mentality ... people would say 'It can't be a hit – it doesn't have a chorus... You're talking about pubic hair, oh my God!'"

Track listing
All tracks were written by Deborah Conway, Dorland Bray, Helen Carter and Stephen Philip.
"Man Overboard" – 4:08
"Fish Tank" – 2:43
"Black Crocodiles" – 3:12

Charts

Weekly charts

Year-end charts

Personnel
Do-Ré-Mi members
Dorland Bray – drums, percussion, backing vocals
Helen Carter – bass guitar, backing vocals
Deborah Conway – lead vocalist
Stephen Philip – guitar

Cover versions
 In 2003, george covered the song as a B-side to their single "Still Real". It featured Do-Re-Mi vocalist Deborah Conway.

References

1982 songs
1985 debut singles
Do-Re-Mi (band) songs